Rasht (electoral district) is an electoral district in the Gilan Province in Iran. This electoral district have 956,971 population and elects 3 members of parliament.

Elections

1st term

2nd term

3rd term

4th term

5th term

6th term

7th term

8th term

9th term

10th term

First round

Second round

References 

Electoral districts of Gilan Province
electoral district